János Koszta (born 18 March 1959 in Sajószentpéter) is a Hungarian football player who currently plays for BVSC Budapest.

References

External links

1959 births
Living people
Hungarian footballers
Hungary international footballers
Fehérvár FC players
Vác FC players
FC Hatvan footballers
Budapesti VSC footballers
Association football goalkeepers
People from Sajószentpéter
Sportspeople from Borsod-Abaúj-Zemplén County